The H. S. M. Spielman House, at 1103 I St. in Tekamah, Nebraska, is a historic house that was built in 1906.  It has also been known as the Chamberlain House and has been denoted NeHBS #BT06-2.  It was listed on the National Register of Historic Places in 1986;  the listing included three contributing buildings.

It is significant for association with H.S.M Spielman (1836-1916), a successful Burt County farmer, who retired from farming to live in this house in 1906, and for its architecture (vernacular Queen Anne, with Neoclassical Revival details).

References

External links 

More photos of the Spielman House at Wikimedia Commons

Houses on the National Register of Historic Places in Nebraska
Queen Anne architecture in Nebraska
Neoclassical architecture in Nebraska
Houses completed in 1906
Houses in Burt County, Nebraska
National Register of Historic Places in Burt County, Nebraska
1906 establishments in Nebraska